Tjalling is a male Dutch and Frisian given name, and may refer to:

 Tjalling van den Bosch (born 1958), Dutch sportsman
 Tjalling Halbertsma (born 1969), lawyer and anthropologist
 Tjalling Koopmans (1910–1985), Dutch economist
 Tjalling Waterbolk (1924–2020), Dutch archaeologist

Dutch masculine given names